Analog photography, known as film photography, is an incorrect term for photography that uses chemical processes to capture an image, typically on paper, film or a hard plate. Analog is a word used to define what a video signal was before digital came along. These photographic processes were the only methods available to photographers for more than a century prior to the invention of digital photography, which uses electronic sensors to record images to digital media.

Film cameras use photographic emulsions, light falling upon silver halides is recorded as a latent image, which is then subjected to photographic processing, making it visible and insensitive to light. Film photography.

Contrary to the belief that digital photography gave a death blow to film, film photography not only survived, but actually expanded across the globe. With the renewed interest in traditional photography, new organizations (like Film Is Not Dead, Lomography) were established and new lines of products helped to perpetuate film photography. In 2017, BH Photo & Video, an e-commerce site for photographic equipment, stated that film sales were increasing by 5% each year in the recent past. The Japan Times claimed that though film photography is a "dying art", Japan could be at the starting point of a movement led by young photographers to keep film alive. Firstpost claimed that a vast majority of photographers are slowly coming back to film.

Decline and revival 

As digital photography took over, Kodak, the major photographic film and cameras producer, announced in 2004 that it is would stop selling and making traditional film cameras in North America and Europe. In 2006, Nikon, the Japanese Camera maker announced that it would stop making most of its film cameras. Incurring losses in the film camera line, Konica-Minolta too announced its discontinuation of cameras and film. In 2008 the first instant film maker Polaroid announced it would stop making instant film.

Interest in all types of film photography has been in the process of revival. The Lomography movement started in 1992, which, BBC claimed, has saved film from disappearing. Lomography started manufacturing updated versions of toy cameras like Lomo LC-A (as Lomo LC-A+), Diana (as Diana F+), Holga, Smena and Lubitel.

Film photographers started experimenting with old alternative photographic processes such as cyanotypes, double exposures, pinholes, and redscales. Worldwide Pinhole Photography Day is observed on the last Sunday of April, every year. Organizations such as Roll4Roll spread the artistic movement of double exposures.

Film Photography Project, a website dedicated to film photography, announced in 2017 the comeback of large-format camera by a new startup called The Intrepid Camera Co.

Popularity 

For those who are keen to work with, or do work with more traditional types of photography, dedicated online communities have been established in which like-minded individuals together share and explore old photographic practices. Film photography has become much more popular with younger generations who have become increasingly interested in the traditional photographic practice; sales in film-based cameras began to soar, and youth were seen to embrace some 19th-century technology. Young photographers say film has more 'soul' than digital. Camera manufacturers have also noticed the renewed interest for film, and new simple point-and-shoot film cameras for beginners, have started to appear.

Polaroid was once a power in film instant photography. Facing the digital revolution, Polaroid stopped production of instant film in 2008. A new company called Impossible Project (now Polaroid through brand acquisition) acquired Polaroid's production machines in order to produce new instant films for vintage Polaroid cameras and to revive Polaroid film technologies.

Art forms 

The revival of film photography has resulted in new art forms and photo challenges, as the technical limitations and constraints of film are used as parameters of the art. In the 36 (or sometimes 24) frames challenges, a single roll of film must capture a specific event, time period or as exercises to improve photography skills.

In contact sheet photography, the traditional contact sheet is used as a way to make pictures consisting of partial photos. The resulting image spans the whole sheet, divided into squares by the black borders of the film.

Advantages and disadvantages

Advantages 
 The time and expense of film photography instill craft and patience.
 Depending on the film sensitivity one can obtain a wide dynamic range.
A film-printed (non-editable) image can help as legal evidence of the subject pictured,
In optimal processing and storage conditions, a film can have a lifetime duration.

Disadvantages 

 Film photography requires photographers to invest more time and skill than digital.
 Film is delicate and requires careful handling, refrigeration, protection from the sun, protection from dust, etc.
 Film negatives and slides require proper developing, or they may suffer from deterioration such as fogging.
 Processing film is expensive and requires additional investment such as scanning, enlarging, or printing.

Material 

Film photography does not just mean photographic film and its processing with photo chemicals. Itself a science and a craft of its own. A change in chemistry and developing time defines the end result. An example is tintype photography. A tintype, also called ferrotype, is a positive photograph produced by applying a collodion-nitrocellulose solution to a thin, black-enameled metal plate immediately before exposure. The tintype, introduced in the mid-19th century, was essentially a variation on the ambrotype, which was a unique image made on glass, instead of metal. Just as the ambrotype was a negative whose silver images appeared grayish white and whose dark backing made the clear areas of shadows appear dark, so the tintype, actually negative in its chemical formation, was made to appear positive by the black plate.

Instant film develops an image automatically, and soon after it is ejected from the camera without any processing by the photographer or by a photographic lab. Photographic paper, however, must be processed after exposure in a dark room or photographic lab.

Processes 

Black-and-white negative film may be processed using a variety of different solutions as well as processing time control, depending on the film type, targeted contrast, or grain structure. While many B&W processing developers are no longer made commercially, (Dektol, D-76 and T-Max developers are still made) other solutions may be mixed using original formulas. The color negative film uses C-41 process, while the color reversible film uses E-6 process for color slides. Kodachrome used to have its own process with one developer bath per each film color layer.

Meanwhile, alternative photographers experiment with different processes such as cross processing which yields unnatural colors and high contrasts. This basically means processing a reversal film using a negative developer bath, or the contrary.

For a more sustainable photography, the black and white negative film may be processed in plant-based chemicals at home.

Film processing does not use analog or digital technology, since information is not translated into electric pulses of varying amplitude or binary data.

Format

Photographic film 

Types
Films can be any of the following types:

Daylight, in both negative and reversal color films
Tungsten, in both negative and reversal color films
Infrared, mostly for black and white films

Silver-based film supports come in various formats, of which the following are still in use:
 110 film (mono-perforated roll in plastic cassette)
 135 film 35 mm (bi-perforated roll in metal can)
120 film 60 mm (non-perforated roll in paper sleeve)
 Large format 4x5" 5x8" 8x10" etc. (gelatin sheets).
Super-8 (mono-perforated roll in plastic cassette)
Cinema 16 mm / 35 mm (bi-perforated roll on metal spool)

Black-and-white films still produced as of 2013 include:

ADOX CHS 100 II
ADOX CMS 20
ADOX Silvermax
ADOX HR-50
CineStill BwXX
Film Washi "W" 25
FOMA FOMAPAN 100 Classic
FOMA FOMAPAN 200 Creative
FOMA FOMAPAN 400 Action
FOMA FOMAPAN R 100
FOMA RETROPAN 320 soft
FujiFilm Neopan Acros 100
Ilford Pan F Plus 50
Ilford HP5 Plus 400
Ilford FP4 Plus 125
Ilford Delta 100
Ilford Delta 400
Ilford Delta 3200
Ilford XP2 Super
Ilford SFX 200
JCH Street Pan 400
Kentmere 400
Kodak T-MAX 100
Kodak TMY-2 400
Kodak TRI-X 400
ORWO UN 54
ORWO N 74 plus
Rollei also markets a line of black-and-white films

Color films (mostly 135 and 120 formats) sold on the market in 2020 are:

 Fujichrome Velvia 50
 Fujichrome Velvia 100
 Fujuchrome Provia 100F
 Kodak Ektachrome 100
 Kodak Ektar 100 Professional
 Kodak Portra 160 Professional
 Kodak Color Plus 200
 Kodacolor Gold 200
 Kodak Vision-3 250 Daylight
 Kodak Ultramax 400
 Kodak Portra 400 Professional
 Kodak Vision-3 500 Tungsten
 Fujicolor Superia 100 R
 Fujifilm Industrial 100
 Fujicolor Superia 200
 Fujifilm Pro 400 H
 Fuji Superia X-tra 400
 Fuji Superia premium 400
 Fuji Superia Venus 800
 Cinestill Daylight 50
 Cinestill Tungsten 800
 Hillvale Sunny 400
 Yashica Color 400
 Yashica Golden 400

See also 
 Analog signal
 Digitization
 Digital photography

References

Further reading 
 Glenn D. Considine, Van Nostrand's Scientific Encyclopedia, Two-Volume Set, 9th Edition (Hoboken, NJ: Wiley, 2002)
 Peter M.B. Walker, Chambers Technical Dictionary (Edinburgh: Chambers 1999)
 William J. Mitchell, The reconfigured eye: visual truth in the post-photographic era (MIT Press, 1994)

Photography by genre